The Bangladesh Northern Evangelical Lutheran Church is a Lutheran denomination in Bangladesh. It is a member of the Lutheran World Federation, which it joined in 1992.

External links 
Lutheran World Federation listing

Lutheran denominations
Lutheranism in Asia
Lutheran World Federation members
Evangelical denominations in Asia